Elections to the South Dakota Senate were held on November 3, 2020 as a part of the biennial elections in the U.S. state of South Dakota. Voters in 35 single-member constituencies elected members to the 93rd Senate. Elections were also held in the state for U.S. president, the U.S. Senate, the U.S. House, and the South Dakota House of Representatives.

Primary elections were held on June 2, 2020.

Background
The Republican Party has been in majority control of the Senate since 1995, and hasn't come close to losing it since then. Although the Democratic Party holds some support from urban areas and districts with a large Native American population, they have been losing seats over time; the last time Democrats held a number of seats in the double-digits was 2010.

Predictions

Results

Overview

By district

Close races
Districts where the margin of victory was under 10%:
 District 26, 5.68%
 District 12, 8.14%
 District 15, 9.50%

Red denotes races won by Republicans. Blue denotes races won by Democrats.

Election results

District 1

District 2

District 3

District 4

District 5

District 6

District 7

District 8

District 9

District 10

District 11

District 12

District 13

District 14

District 15

District 16

District 17

District 18

District 19

District 20

District 21

District 22

District 23

District 24

District 25

District 26

District 27

District 28

District 29

District 30

District 31

District 32

District 33

District 34

District 35

See also
 2020 South Dakota elections
 2020 United States state legislative elections

References

Senate
South Dakota Senate
South Dakota Senate elections